Dominican literature may refer to:
 Dominican Republic literature, literature produced within the Dominican Republic
 Literature produced by monks, nuns, and friars within the religious order of the Order of Preachers, commonly called Dominicans